Ptyongnathosia harpifera is a species of moth of the family Tortricidae. It is found in Napo Province, Ecuador.

The wingspan is about 19.5 mm. The ground colour of the forewings is greyish cream dotted with blackish grey. The hindwings are whitish, dotted with grey.

Etymology
The species name refers to large dorsobasal processes of the sacculus and is derived from Latin harpa (meaning sickle) and fero (meaning I carry).

References

Moths described in 2009
Euliini